A rare-earth mineral contains one or more rare-earth elements as major metal constituents. Rare-earth minerals are usually found in association with alkaline to peralkaline igneous complexes, in pegmatites associated with alkaline magmas and in or associated with carbonatite intrusives. Perovskite mineral phases are common hosts to rare-earth elements within the alkaline complexes. Mantle-derived carbonate melts are also carriers of the rare earths. Hydrothermal deposits associated with alkaline magmatism contain a variety of rare-earth minerals.

The following includes the relatively common hydrothermal rare-earth minerals and minerals that often contain significant rare-earth substitution:

Aeschynite-(Y or Ce)
allanite
apatite
bastnäsite
britholite
brockite
cerite
Dollaseite-(Ce)
fluocerite
fluorite
gadolinite
monazite
parisite-(Ce or La)
stillwellite
synchysite
titanite
wakefieldite
xenotime
zircon

Bibliography
 Jones, Adrian P., Francis Wall and C. Terry Williams, eds. (1996) Rare Earth Minerals: Chemistry, Origin and Ore Deposits, The Mineralogy Society Series #7, 372 pp. 
China New Policy Affect Rare Earth Price

Lanthanide minerals
Yttrium minerals
Scandium minerals